Rachael Louise Axon (born 9 November 1985) is an English former footballer who played as a midfielder. She has previously played in Brazil, Norway and America.

References

External links
 Rachel Axon profile at Houston Dash

1985 births
Living people
Footballers from Greater London
English women's footballers
Women's association football midfielders
UAB Blazers women's soccer players
Oregon State Beavers women's soccer players
Avaldsnes IL players
Kolbotn Fotball players
Houston Dash players
FA Women's National League players
USL W-League (1995–2015) players
National Women's Soccer League players
Campeonato Brasileiro de Futebol Feminino Série A1 players
England women's under-23 international footballers
Medalists at the 2009 Summer Universiade
Universiade bronze medalists for Great Britain
Universiade medalists in football
English expatriate women's footballers
English expatriate sportspeople in the United States
Expatriate women's soccer players in the United States
English expatriate sportspeople in Canada
Expatriate women's soccer players in Canada
English expatriate sportspeople in Brazil
Expatriate women's footballers in Brazil
English expatriate sportspeople in Norway
Expatriate women's footballers in Norway
Associação Acadêmica e Desportiva Vitória das Tabocas players
Ottawa Fury (women) players